The 1981 Kerry Senior Football Championship was the 81st staging of the Kerry Senior Football Championship since its establishment by the Kerry County Board in 1889. The championship ran from 13 June to 27 September 1981.

Feale Rangers entered the championship as the defending champions, however, they were beaten by Austin Stacks in the semi-finals. 

The final was played on 27 September 1981 at Austin Stack Park in Tralee, between South Kerry and Austin Stacks, in what was their first ever meeting in the final. South Kerry won the match by 1-12 to 0-11 to claim their fourth championship title overall and a first title in 23 years.

Results

First round

Second round

Quarter-finals

Semi-finals

Final

Championship statistics

Miscellaneous

 South Kerry win their first title since 1958.
 South Kerry qualify for the final for the first time since 1958.

References

Kerry Senior Football Championship
1981 in Gaelic football